Rasbora borneensis is a species of ray-finned fish in the genus Rasbora. It is found in southern and western Borneo.

References 

Rasboras
Freshwater fish of Borneo
Taxa named by Pieter Bleeker
Fish described in 1860